Skrzypiec may refer to the following places:
Skrzypiec, Łódź Voivodeship (central Poland)
Skrzypiec, Opole Voivodeship (south-west Poland)
Skrzypiec, West Pomeranian Voivodeship (north-west Poland)

See also